Guillermo Rafael Douglas Sabattini (January 1909, in Paysandú, Uruguay – 1967) was a rower from  Uruguay.

He competed for Uruguay in the 1932 Summer Olympics held in Los Angeles, United States in the single sculls event where he finished in third place.

References
Sports-reference

1909 births
Uruguayan people of Scottish descent
Sportspeople from Paysandú
Olympic rowers of Uruguay
Olympic bronze medalists for Uruguay
Rowers at the 1932 Summer Olympics
1967 deaths
Olympic medalists in rowing
Uruguayan male rowers
Medalists at the 1932 Summer Olympics
20th-century Uruguayan people